Timothy James Simpson (born March 5, 1969) is a former American football offensive guard who played one season with the Pittsburgh Steelers of the National Football League. He was drafted by the Cleveland Browns in the twelfth round of the 1992 NFL Draft. He played college football at the University of Illinois at Urbana–Champaign. Simpson was also a member of the New York Jets, London Monarchs, Peoria Pirates and Bloomington Edge.

Early years
Simpson played high school football at East Peoria High School in East Peoria, Illinois. He was a four-year starter for the Red Raiders as well as a two-time All-Conference and All-State selection. He also participated in wrestling, compiling a record of 157–4, including 3rd and 4th place IHSA state finishes. Simpson was inducted the Greater Peoria Sports Hall of Fame in 2006.

College career
Simpson played for the Illinois Fighting Illini from 1988 to 1991, starting all 48 games of his career. He earned 1st team American Football Coaches All-America honors his senior year in 1991 and was co-winner of the Illini Male Athlete of the Year award, also known as the Dike Eddleman Athlete-of-the-Year, in 1992. He was also a two-time All-Big Ten selection.

Professional career
Simpson was selected by the Cleveland Browns with the 329th pick in the 1992 NFL Draft. He played in four games for the Pittsburgh Steelers in 1994.

He then signed with the New York Jets. In February 1996, he was allocated to the World League of American Football to play for the London Monarchs. He was released by the Jets in August 1996.

Simpson played for the Peoria Pirates from 2000 to 2002, winning ArenaCup III in 2002. He retired after the 2002 season.

He signed with the Bloomington Edge of the Champions Professional Indoor Football League in 2013 but retired before the start of the season.

Coaching career
Simpson helped coach offensive and defensive line at his former high school in 2006, and later was offensive line coach of the Bloomington Extreme of United Indoor Football in 2008.

References

External links
Just Sports Stats

Living people
1969 births
American football offensive guards
Illinois Fighting Illini football players
Pittsburgh Steelers players
New York Jets players
London Monarchs players
Peoria Pirates players
Bloomington Edge players
Players of American football from Illinois
Sportspeople from Peoria, Illinois